Komi Tje (Ԏ ԏ; italics: Ԏ ԏ) is a letter of the Molodtsov alphabet, a variant of Cyrillic. It was used only in the writing of the Komi language in the 1920s.

Computing codes

See also 
Т т : Cyrillic letter Te
Ћ ћ : Cyrillic letter Tshe (Tje)
Cyrillic characters in Unicode

Komi language
Cyrillic letters
Permic languages